L-1VE is the first video album by British progressive metal band Haken. It was released on 22 June 2018. Most of the concert was filmed on 13 April 2017, at the Melkweg in Amsterdam during their 10th anniversary tour in 2017. It also includes four bonus tracks filmed at ProgPower USA 2016 at the Center Stage in Atlanta, which also includes Mike Portnoy's cameo appearance on gong, as well as all of the official videos from the Affinity album.

While it includes live performances of songs from all their albums, most of them are from The Mountain and Affinity.

The main show and the bonus material on the DVD are also mixed in Dolby AC3 5.1 surround sound.

Background 
About the release of the live album, the band commented on their official website:

On 11 May 2018, Inside Out Music's official YouTube channel released a live performance of the song "In Memoriam", and Charlie Griffiths also commented:

On 7 June 2018, the same channel released a live performance of the song "The Endless Knot". The band said:

The artwork was once again produced by long-time collaborators Blacklake. The live audio was mixed by Jerry Guidroz, known for his work with Neal Morse and The Winery Dogs. Post production/editing work on both the Amsterdam and Atlanta concert films was carried out by Crystal Spotlight, known for their work with Steven Wilson and Dream Theater.

Critical reception 

Reviewing the release for AllMusic, Thom Jurek claimed that "With few notable exceptions, it's rare that a live album would provide suitable enough introductions for new listeners and unsuspecting fans. That said, England's Haken prove the exception to the rule on L1ve."

Track listing 
The track listing consists of two CDs, two DVDs and three official videos.

DVD 1 – Live in Amsterdam 2017
 "affinity.exe/Initiate" (from Affinity)
 "In Memoriam" (from The Mountain)
 "1985" (from Affinity)
 "Red Giant" (from Affinity)
 "Aquamedley" (a medley of Aquarius)
 "As Death Embraces" (from The Mountain)
 "Atlas Stone" (from The Mountain)
 "Cockroach King" (from The Mountain)
 "The Architect" (from Affinity)
 "The Endless Knot" (from Affinity)
 "Visions" (from Visions)

DVD 2 – Live at Prog Power 2016
 "Falling Back to Earth" (from The Mountain)
 "Earthrise" (from Affinity)
 "Pareidolia" (from The Mountain)
 "Crystallised" (from Restoration)
 "Initiate" (Official Video)
 "Earthrise" (Official Video)
 "Lapse" (Official Video)

CD 1 – Live in Amsterdam 2017
All songs and arrangements written by Haken, except where noted.

CD 2 – Live in Amsterdam 2017

All songs and arrangements written by Haken, except where noted.

L+1VE 

 Live at Prog Power 2016 
All songs and arrangements written by Haken, except where noted.

Personnel 
Ross Jennings – vocals
Richard Henshall – guitars, keyboards, backing vocals
Charlie Griffiths – guitars, backing vocals
Raymond Hearne – drums, backing vocals, tuba
Diego Tejeida – keyboards, backing vocals, additional lead vocals on "Pareidolia"
Conner Green – bass guitar, backing vocals
Mike Portnoy – gong (on "Crystallised")

Charts

References 

2018 video albums
Haken (band) albums
Inside Out Music video albums